Bivetiella is a genus of sea snails, marine gastropod mollusks in the family Cancellariidae, the nutmeg snails.

Species
Species within the genus Bivetiella include:

 Bivetiella cancellata (Linnaeus, 1767)
 Bivetiella pulchra G.B. Sowerby I, 1832
 Bivetiella similis (Sowerby G.B. I, 1833)

References

External links
 * Verhecken A. (2007). Revision of the Cancellariidae (Mollusca, Neogastropoda, Cancellarioidea) of the eastern Atlantic (40°N-40°S) and the Mediterranean. Zoosystema : 29(2): 281-364

Cancellariidae